Kazincbarcika is a district in north-western part of Borsod-Abaúj-Zemplén County. Kazincbarcika is also the name of the town where the district seat is found. The district is located in the Northern Hungary Statistical Region.

Geography 
Kazincbarcika District borders with Edelény District northeast, Miskolc District to the southeast, Bélapátfalva District (Heves County) to the southwest, Ózd District to the west, Putnok District to the northwest. The number of the inhabited places in Kazincbarcika District is 22.

Municipalities 
The district has 3 town, 2 large villages and 17 villages.
(ordered by population, as of 1 January 2012)

The bolded municipalities are cities, italics municipalities are large villages.

Demographics

In 2011, it had a population of 66,470 and the population density was 195/km².

Ethnicity
Besides the Hungarian majority, the main minorities are the Roma (approx. 4,000), German (350), Polish and Rusyn (150).

Total population (2011 census): 66,470
Ethnic groups (2011 census): Identified themselves: 63,350 persons:
Hungarians: 58,247 (91.94%)
Gypsies: 3,919 (6.18%)
Others and indefinable: 1,184 (1.87%)
Approx. 3,000 persons in Kazincbarcika District did not declare their ethnic group at the 2011 census.

Religion
Religious adherence in the county according to 2011 census:

Catholic – 20,582 (Roman Catholic – 17,135; Greek Catholic – 3,444);
Reformed – 14,222;
Evangelical – 422;
other religions – 1,167; 
Non-religious – 12,810; 
Atheism – 790;
Undeclared – 16,477.

Gallery

See also
List of cities and towns of Hungary
Kazincbarcika Subregion (until 2013)

References

External links
 Postal codes of the Kazincbarcika District

Districts in Borsod-Abaúj-Zemplén County